Khalsa College may refer to:

 Khalsa College, Amritsar, the historic institution founded in 1892
 Sri Guru Tegh Bahadur Khalsa College, a constituent college of the University of Delhi
 Guru Nanak Khalsa College (King's Circle), a college in Mumbai
 Lyallpur Khalsa College, established in Lyallpur (now Faisalabad, Pakistan) in 1908, shifted to Jalandhar in 1948